Fram Creek is a stream in Styria, Slovenia. Its source is on the Pohorje Massif, near Sveti Areh in the Maribor Pohorje Ski Resort. It passes Fram and Rače and merges with other streams of the Drava Plain and joins the Polskava River near Župečja Vas.

References

Rivers of Styria (Slovenia)